Samuele Schiavina (5 June 1971 – 26 October 2016) was an Italian professional racing cyclist. He rode in the 1998 Tour de France.

Schiavina died in October 2016, after having been severely injured in a motorcycle crash.

References

External links
 

1971 births
2016 deaths
Italian male cyclists
Sportspeople from Ferrara
Cyclists from Emilia-Romagna